The 2004 ARAG World Team Cup was a tennis tournament play on outdoor clay courts. It was the 26th edition of the World Team Cup, and was part of the 2004 ATP Tour. It took place at the Rochusclub in Düsseldorf, Germany, from 16 May through 21 May 2004.

Chile were the defending champions, and they won the title again, defeating Australia in the final by two rubbers to one.

Squads

Blue group

Wayne Arthurs (# 12 Doubles)
Paul Hanley (# 8 Doubles)
Lleyton Hewitt (# 12)
Mark Philippoussis (# 18)

Lucas Arnold Ker (# 27 Doubles)
Juan Ignacio Chela (# 23)
Gastón Gaudio (# 44)
Mariano Zabaleta (# 31)

Sjeng Schalken (# 15)
John van Lottum (# 96)
Martin Verkerk (# 19)

Bob Bryan (# 1 Doubles)
Mike Bryan (# 1 Doubles)
Robby Ginepri (# 39)
Vince Spadea (# 28)

Red group

Adrián García (# 122)
Fernando González (# 16)
Nicolás Massú (# 11)

Jiří Novák (# 14)
Radek Štěpánek (# 59)

Tommy Haas (# 114)
Nicolas Kiefer (# 34)
Rainer Schüttler (# 7)

Galo Blanco (# 93)
Àlex Corretja (# 94)
Albert Costa (# 27)
Feliciano López (# 24)

 Rankings are as of May 17, 2004.

Round robin

Blue group

Standings

Australia vs. United States

Netherlands vs. Argentina

Australia vs. Netherlands

Argentina vs. United States

Australia vs. Argentina

Netherlands vs. United States

Red group

Standings

Germany vs. Spain

Chile vs. Czech Republic

Germany vs. Czech Republic

Chile vs. Spain

Chile vs. Germany

Spain vs. Czech Republic

Final

Chile vs. Australia

References

World Team Cup
World Team Cup, 2004
World Team Cup